Out of Place is a surfing documentary directed by Scott Ditzenberger and Darrin McDonald that follows the lives of several lake surfers in Cleveland, Ohio. While Lake Erie does not offer the quality of waves they would prefer, business commitments, family, and friends keep them from moving. As the best waves occur in the winter, the surfers often experience freezing conditions including during a snowbound Great Lakes Eastern Surfing Association competition featured in the film.

Production 
Production for the film began in the fall of 2001 and wrapped in the summer of 2009. Unlike many surf genre films, Out Of Place was entirely independently financed and produced. The project began with an idea Scott Ditzenberger had to film his friends surfing in Lake Erie. It was not until he discussed the subject with Darrin McDonald, a PBS producer, and Tom Heinrich that Out Of Place became a serious film project. In 2007, Kurt Vincent began editing the film. Vincent happened to be sharing a house with Robby Staebler of The Barn Owls, leading to The Barn Owls involvement in the film's soundtrack.

Release 
Out of Place opened at the New York Surf Film Festival in September 2009 where it won the Viewers’ Choice Award for Best Feature. It has also screened at the 25th Santa Barbara International Film Festival, the Cleveland International Film Festival, the 2010 Taranaki Surf Film Festival in New Zealand and the 2010 Lighthouse International Film Festival in Long Beach Island, New Jersey. In July 2010, the film screened in Hawaii for the first time at the Doris Duke Theatre at the Honolulu Academy of Art as part of its 2010 surf film festival. It has also been screened at an April 2010 benefit for the Surfrider Foundation in New York City.

Soundtrack 
The movie features songs from several artists including The Barn Owls, Colin Wilson, The Dreadful Yawns, Gabe Schray, Great Lake Swimmers, Neil Turk, The All Golden, Celebrity Pilots and This Moment in Black History. The Barn Owls, a psychedelic rock duo from Columbus, Ohio, featuring Robby and Jason Staebler, contributed original music for the film's soundtrack.

The soundtrack was released in March 2010 on Actual Archives, a record label based in Akron, Ohio. The soundtrack artwork was designed by Cleveland-based graphic designer Trevor Marzella.

Cast 
In alphabetical order:
Gennaro Barilaro
How Beates
Eric Becker
Bob a.k.a. Freakface
Andrew Carlson
Austin Dalpe
Stevie Dalpe
Dirty Dex
Kirk Dorony
Paul Doughty
Edmund
Sean "Ripper" Flanagan
Chris Gibbons
Luke Gibbons
Rick Guest
Ben Haehn
Nathan Hammond
Suzie "Suzymyster" Hancock
Kevin Hegedus
Jay Hill
David Hubbard
Jason's friend Michael
Ralph Joslin
Mike Junewicz
Paul Kovalcik
Ali Kurzeja
Vince Labbe
Gary "Frozenbolt" Lagore
Jason Lance
Joel Lehman
Chris Lipsey
Neal Luoma a.k.a. Oscar
Jimmy "the Kid" Manson
Chris McIntosh
Mike Miller
Jen Moldovan
Johnny "Shred" Moore
Tim Moran
James "Kimo" Moya
Kyle Nesbit
M. Yvette "Evie" Obias
Guillermo Pardo
Vince Piscitello
Mark Renko
Sean Rooney
Jack Ryncarz
Johnny Santosuooso
Magilla Schaus
Sean with the Laptop
Rich Stack
Kevin "Snake" Stoeveken
Bryan "Indysfr" Wedmore
Bill Weeber
Amanda Weigand
Kevin Weigand
Dr. Joe Wellington
Hobie Williams
Todd "the Rod" Williams
Jennifer Wooley
Marikate Workman
J.A. Yanak

See also
Unsalted: A Great Lakes Experience, a 2005 documentary film also about lake surfing

References

External links 
  

Documentary films about surfing
Lake surfing
Films shot in Cleveland
American sports documentary films
Sports in Cleveland
Surfing in the United States
2009 films
2009 documentary films
American surfing films
2000s American films